Crotaphopeltis braestrupi is a species of snake in the family Colubridae. The species is endemic to East Africa.

Etymology
The specific name, braestrupi, is in honor of Frits Wimpffen Braestrup (1906–1999), who was curator of the zoological museum of the University of Copenhagen.

Geographic range
C. braestrupi is found in eastern Kenya and southeastern Somalia, on the coastal plain.

Habitat

Behavior
C. braestrupi is terrestrial and nocturnal.

Diet
C. braestrupi preys upon amphibians.

Reproduction
C. braestrupi is oviparous.

References

Further reading
Rasmussen JB (1985). "A new species of Crotaphopeltis from East Africa, with remarks on the identity of Dipsas hippocrepis Reinhardt, 1843 (Serpentes: Boiginae)". Steenstrupia 11 (4): 113–129. (Crotaphopeltis braestrupi, new species).
Spawls S, Howell K, Hinkel H, Menegon M (2018). Field Guide to East African Reptiles, Second Edition. London: Bloomsbury Natural History. 624 pp. . (Crotaphopeltis braestrupi, p. 523).

Reptiles described in 1985
Reptiles of Kenya
Reptiles of Somalia
Colubrids